George Murray House may refer to:

George Murray House (Park City, Utah), listed on the National Register of Historic Places in Summit County, Utah
George Murray House (Racine, Wisconsin), listed on the National Register of Historic Places in Racine County, Wisconsin